René van Hove (11 April 1913 – 19 August 1997) was a Dutch cyclist. He competed in the individual and team road race events at the 1936 Summer Olympics.

See also
 List of Dutch Olympic cyclists

References

1913 births
1997 deaths
Dutch male cyclists
Olympic cyclists of the Netherlands
Cyclists at the 1936 Summer Olympics
People from Terneuzen
Cyclists from Zeeland